Tatjana Frage (born ) is an Israeli female former volleyball player, playing as a right side hitter. She was part of the Israel women's national volleyball team.

She competed at the 2011 Women's European Volleyball Championship.

References

External links

1973 births
Living people
Israeli women's volleyball players
Place of birth missing (living people)